Juan Antonio Cabral (born 19 June 1984) is a Paraguayan footballer who plays for Lota Schwager of the Primera División B in Chile. He previously played for Universidad de Concepción, Cobresal and Palestino in Primera División and Deportes Puerto Montt in Primera División B.

Career
Born in Asunción, Paraguay, Cabral moved to Chile to play for U. de Concepción at age 25. He didn't feature regularly with the club, and went on loan to Cobresal during 2009. Manager Jorge Pellicer requested that Cabral return to U. de Concepción in 2010, and he impressed by scoring several goals for the club.

In January 2011, Cabral joined Palestino from U. de Concepción.

Honours

Club
Universidad de Concepción
 Copa Chile (1): 2009

References

External links
 

1984 births
Living people
Paraguayan footballers
Paraguayan expatriate footballers
Universidad de Concepción footballers
Puerto Montt footballers
Lota Schwager footballers
Club Deportivo Palestino footballers
Cobresal footballers
Expatriate footballers in Chile
Chilean Primera División players
Primera B de Chile players
Association football midfielders